Glasshouse is the third studio album by English singer-songwriter Jessie Ware. It was released on 20 October 2017 through Island Records. The album was supported by the singles "Midnight", "Selfish Love" and "Alone".

Background
Commenting on the creation process, Ware elaborated that she "really tried to rush this record" because she wanted to finish the album before having her first baby in September 2016, and "was being led by other people in the songwriting rooms, more than I was leading" as she was pregnant when the album was being written. She further added: "I was writing really shit music because I had this fear like, 'Must provide. Must make a hit for my unborn child' [...] I think I'd lost a bit of my identity, and it took my mate Benny Blanco to be like, 'This is really shit. I don't know what you're doing. Why are you not doing what you do?' It was such a relief, because I knew exactly what he meant." Following her conversation with Blanco in December 2016, she decided to reconstruct the album and booked additional recordings sessions with musicians such as producer Starsmith and songwriter James Newman.

Next to Starmsith and Newman the singer collaborated with a variety of producers and songwriters on Glasshouse, including Julia Michaels, Francis and the Lights, Cashmere Cat, Benny Blanco and Ed Sheeran.  Ware cited Childish Gambino's Awaken, My Love! (2016), and Solange's A Seat at the Table (2016), and Christine and the Queens' Chaleur humaine (2014) as her major inspirations for the album, noting: "They all have such strong identities, and I wanted that. I wanted to feel in control," she said. When asked about the message behind this album, she said: "I've written with a lot of different people, but I think what's bringing it all together is my voice, and the storytelling. It's quite a personal record, which I didn't realize [when writing it]. I thought I was just writing songs, but it's become this record that's for my husband and my baby. It's been a wild couple of years, and I feel like this album represents those ups and downs, the fear, the beauty, and the celebrations." On 5 September 2017, Ware announced the album's title and posted its artwork on social media.

Title and artwork
 The album title was inspired by Edward Thomas's poem "I Built Myself a House of Glass". While song titles were used while naming Ware's previous album, she "just didn't feel like any of them did justice to this album." In an interview with Billboard, she further commented: "Glasshouse, I guess for me represents this beautiful thing, which is very easy to shatter. I’ve become a mother; it’s changed my world for the better. But I’m also learning how to do it. Also, I think I’ve given more of myself in this record [...] So, it’s about me working out this situation and trying to do the best, but also knowing that it’s quite a fragile, funny situation."

The cover artwork for Glasshouse features Ware emerging from the courtyard of the Neuendorf House on the island of Mallorca, Spain. Designed by architects John Pawson and Claudio Silvestrin in 1991, the modernist villa is a vacation house for a German art dealer set in an almond grove. Ware wanted the cover to emphasise architecture; as she explained in an interview with The Fader the week before the image was shot, “This record is so personal and romantic, that I want a nostalgic image on the front [...] I really want architecture in the album cover. I want to graduate from being in the [photo] studio for artwork where it had to be all about my face. I want it to be a beautiful image that maybe I'm a small part of.” As a result, the cover is not exclusively focused on Ware. According to Pitchfork, "the eye is drawn as much to the soft, ruddy brown of the walls or the blue sky packed into a crisp rectangle above her", while Ware's name and the word "Glasshouse" are stylised in an uppercase pale pink font and located in the center of the image. The album artwork and singles campaign was designed by Samuel Muir Studio.

Critical reception

At Metacritic, which assigns a normalised rating out of 100 to reviews from mainstream critics, Glasshouse has an average score of 72 out of 100, which indicates "generally favorable reviews" based on 13 reviews. Pitchfork editor Brad Nelson felt that "each song on Glasshouse has its own distinct aesthetic; unlike her previous albums there are no songs here that could be confused for each other, none that seem an afterthought carved from the greater mood of the album. Here, tracks are discrete entities, seemingly designed and assembled by its own team of architects [...] It almost feels like Ware is trying to divert attention from herself, but she is positioned directly at the center of the album’s trembling choreography. She connects each of these unrelated environments—shaping them." Andy Kellman from AllMusic gave it a three-and-a-half-out-of-five rating. In the positive review he wrote that "Ware's third album is packed with finely woven adult-pop ballads about lust, longing, commitment, and reassurance." He found that "Though Ware co-wrote all the songs and is in full command from start to finish, the album has a stitched-together quality that starts to slowly unravel during the second half.

The A.V. Club gave the album a B+ rating and compared the album to "Haim’s studio-perfect (and occasionally too studied) evocation of decades of pop radio and adult contemporary music. It’s timeless stuff, almost imagistic in the way it conjures the specters of belters past like Whitney Houston, Mariah Carey, and Annie Lennox." The online newspaper added: "Glasshouse resolutely has the goods, packaging a handful of searing, bring-down-the-house ballads in an album that stands alongside her debut [...] There’s an earned earnestness to its emotional palette, even as it tumbles into schmaltzy paeans to domestic bliss. If it weren’t executed so sincerely, the whole thing would fall flat. But Ware walks the tightwire, and the result is as thrilling, in its own quiet way, as anything she’s produced." Michael Cragg, writing for The Observer, described the release as "solid ground" and a "pivotal release for Ware." He felt that while the singles released in advance of the album "hinted at a more robust sound [...] it still feels a little too safe," though all song "perfectly showcase Ware’s crystalline vocals – you just wish she’d step out of her comfort zone more often." The same rating was given by Clashs Robin Murray, who wrote that Glasshouse "promised to break the glass ceiling, but instead finds the singer treading lukewarm water [...] Too often, it fails to challenge itself."

Commercial performance
Glasshouse debuted at number seven in the United Kingdom on 23 October 2017, with 8,448 album-equivalent units, as reported by Music Week. The album became Ware's third consecutive top ten entry on the UK Albums Chart.

Track listing

Notes
  signifies a co-producer
  signifies an additional producer.

Charts

Certifications

References

2017 albums
Albums produced by Benny Blanco
Albums produced by Cashmere Cat
Island Records albums
Jessie Ware albums